The third season of the Spanish Gran Hermano launched on April 4, 2002 with the final on July 14, 2002, lasting 102 days. It is the third Spanish edition of the reality franchise Big Brother. Javito García emerged as the winner, with Patricia Ledesma runner-up and Kiko Hernández third. A total of 9 housemates were evicted: Andrés, Candi, Carolina, Elba, Jacinto, Javier, Jorge, Noemi and Raquel; Óscar voluntary left the show.

In the 2010 season "Gran Hermano: El Reencuentro" (All Stars), Noemi and Raquel returned to the house.

Contestants in eviction order

Nominations Table 
This year Housemates Nominated three Housemates for Eviction, and the three or more Housemates with the most Nominations faced the Public Vote.

Notes

See also
 Main Article about the show

2002 Spanish television seasons
GH 3